Kim Su-hyeon (born 6 February 1995) is a South Korean weightlifter. She won the bronze medal in the women's 76kg event at the 2022 World Weightlifting Championships held in Bogotá, Colombia.

She competed in the women's 69 kg event at the 2014 Asian Games held in Incheon, South Korea without winning a medal. She finished in 4th place. In 2018, she represented South Korea at the Asian Games held in Jakarta, Indonesia in the women's 69 kg event.

She won the bronze medal in the women's 76 kg event at the 2019 Asian Weightlifting Championships held in Ningbo, China.

She represented South Korea at the 2020 Summer Olympics in Tokyo, Japan. She competed in the women's 76 kg event.

References

External links 
 

Living people
1995 births
Place of birth missing (living people)
South Korean female weightlifters
Weightlifters at the 2014 Asian Games
Weightlifters at the 2018 Asian Games
Asian Games competitors for South Korea
Weightlifters at the 2020 Summer Olympics
Olympic weightlifters of South Korea
World Weightlifting Championships medalists
21st-century South Korean women